Lavérune is a commune in the Hérault département in the Occitanie region in southern France.

Population

Sport
Palla Tamburello: the main team is the Tambourin Club Laverune

See also
Communes of the Hérault department

References

Communes of Hérault